Leonard Irell Webster (born February 10, 1965) is an American former professional baseball player. He played in Major League Baseball as a catcher from 1989 to 2000. Webster was one of the active players wearing number 42 while playing for the Baltimore Orioles when Major League Baseball retired the number to honor Jackie Robinson in 1997. He made his debut on September 1, 1989 as a defensive replacement at catcher with the Minnesota Twins. His final game was on September 23, 2000 as a pinch hitter for Jeremy Powell with the Montreal Expos.

In 587 games over 12 seasons, Webster posted a .254 batting average (368-for-1450) with 157 runs, 73 doubles, 2 triples, 33 home runs, 176 RBI, 140 bases on balls, .324 on-base percentage and .375 slugging percentage. He finished his career with a .995 fielding percentage as a catcher. In the 1997 postseason covering 7 games, he hit .200 (3-for-15) with 1 run and 1 RBI.

Personal
Webster is the nephew of former Major League umpire Charlie Williams.

References

External links

1965 births
Living people
African-American baseball players
American expatriate baseball players in Canada
Baltimore Orioles players
Baseball players from New Orleans
Boston Red Sox players
Elizabethton Twins players
Grambling State Tigers baseball players
Kenosha Twins players
Major League Baseball catchers
Minnesota Twins players
Montreal Expos players
Orlando Sun Rays players
Orlando Twins players
Philadelphia Phillies players
Portland Beavers players
Visalia Oaks players